The first manager of Swindon Town Football Club was Sam Allen, appointed in 1902. The club's current head coach is Ben Garner. Swindon Town have had 36 permanent managers (of whom six also served as player-manager) while Iffy Onuora, Mark Cooper and Luke Williams have served as both interim manager and permanent manager.

Swindon Town's first ever manager was former Swindon Town committee member Sam Allen. Allen remains Swindon Town's longest-serving manager, holding the position for 31 years between 1902 and 1933, spanning 1,192 matches. Swindon Town's shortest reigning permanent manager is Martin Ling, who was in charge for nine games. Statistically, Swindon Town's least successful manager is Paul Hart, who won just one of his 11 matches in charge.

The first manager under whom Swindon Town won a major trophy was Danny Williams, who guided the club to the Football League Cup in the 1968–69 season. Fred Ford, Lou Macari, Osvaldo Ardiles, Glenn Hoddle, Steve McMahon and Paolo Di Canio have also won trophies with the club.

List of managers
Updated 18 March 2023.

Key
* Served as caretaker manager. 
† Served as caretaker manager before being appointed permanently.
‡ Appointed as Director of Football, but with responsibility for team selection.
^ Appointed as Head Coach

Managers with honours

Footnotes

 
Swindon Town